Hershel L. Herzog (1924 – August 4, 1998) was a pharmaceutical researcher for Schering-Plough, then Schering Corporation, where he was ultimately appointed senior vice president of drug development in 1977.

Education 
He held a B.S. in chemical engineering from University of Illinois, and  M.S. & Ph.D from University of Southern California

References 

The Collected Original Scientific Articles of Hershel L. Herzog, Introduction. By Hershel L. Herzog, May 1989
 Hershel L. Herzog, 74, Executive And Pharmaceutical Researcher  New York Times  by David J. Morrow, August 10, 1998  
Memoir of a Life in Science and Technology (an outline), By Hershel Herzog, 1997

1924 births
1998 deaths
University of Illinois alumni
University of Southern California alumni